Glyphotaelius is a genus of insect belonging to the family Limnephilidae.

The genus was first described by Stephens in 1833.

The species of this genus are found in Eurasia and Northern America.

Species:
 Glyphotaelius pellucidus (Retzius, 1783)

References

Trichoptera
Trichoptera genera